Brian Henderson (born May 12, 1997) is an American professional stock car racing driver. He has driven in the NASCAR Xfinity Series, NASCAR K&N Pro Series East, National Auto Sport Association, Sports Car Club of America and Pirelli World Challenge.

Racing career
Henderson began his racing career in go-karts at the age of five before moving up to late model racing.

Sports cars
In 2013, Henderson moved from oval racing to road racing, driving in the National Auto Sport Association and moving up to the Spec Miata class a year later.

Partnering with Rossini Racing Products in 2017, he moved to the Sports Car Club of America while running NASA events, still racing Spec Miatas. Henderson claimed the 2017 NASA championship in the Performance Touring E Eastern States class. He also raced part-time in the Pirelli World Challenge, driving for Copeland Motorsports in partnership with Rossini. Henderson scored a top-five finish at Lime Rock Park. Also in 2017, he competed in the Mazda Teen Challenge, earning an invite to the MRT24 Shootout.

In 2020, Henderson ran as high as second in the Spec Miata class of the SCCA National Championship Runoffs before falling to fourth on the final lap.

Stock cars

In the 2016 NASCAR K&N Pro Series East season, Henderson signed on to drive two events for Precision Performance Motorsports. Henderson, at the time, was also a development driver for the team. and scored a Top-10 in his debut at Virginia International Raceway, finishing ninth after being spun in the middle of the race.  He also competed at New Hampshire Motor Speedway, marking the largest oval track that he had raced on.

In 2017, Henderson made his Xfinity debut at Watkins Glen, driving the No. 90 car for Brandonbilt Motorsports. He started 34th and finished 33rd after struggling early in the race and making contact with Blake Koch.

A year later, he once again returned to Watkins Glen. He partnered with Friends of Jaclyn Foundation for two races: Watkins Glen for Brandonbilt Motorsports No. 90 and Road America for Brandonbilt using No. 38 owner points from RSS Racing to make the field.

Personal life
Henderson attended Stafford Senior High School and graduated in 2015. He currently attends University of North Carolina at Charlotte, majoring in mechanical engineering.

Motorsports career results

SCCA National Championship Runoffs

NASCAR
(key) (Bold – Pole position awarded by qualifying time. Italics – Pole position earned by points standings or practice time. * – Most laps led.)

Xfinity Series

K&N Pro Series East

 Season still in progress
 Ineligible for series points

References

External links
 
 
 Pirelli World Challenge bio

living people
1997 births
Racing drivers from Virginia
NASCAR drivers
People from Falmouth, Virginia
SCCA National Championship Runoffs participants
Michelin Pilot Challenge drivers